Crvulevo is a village in the municipality of Karbinci, North Macedonia.

Demographics
According to the 2002 census, the village had a total of 51 inhabitants. Ethnic groups in the village include:

Macedonians 42
Serbs 1
Aromanians 8

References

Villages in Karbinci Municipality